The Great Lakes Loons are a Minor League Baseball team of the Midwest League and the High-A affiliate of the Los Angeles Dodgers. They are located in Midland, Michigan, and play their home games at Dow Diamond, which opened in April 2007.

History

The Midwest League came to Battle Creek, in 1995 after the franchise formerly known as the Madison Hatters moved. The team was first known as the Battle Creek Golden Kazoos. Due to a trademark dispute and general fan dissatisfaction with the name (which is a nickname for the nearby city of Kalamazoo), the name was changed to the Michigan Battle Cats on March 9, 1995. 

The team was affiliated with the Boston Red Sox (1995–98) and Houston Astros (1999–2002). The team changed its name to the Battle Creek Yankees after becoming an affiliate of the New York Yankees in 2003. The Tampa Bay Devil Rays took over affiliation of the team after the 2004 season, and the team name was changed to the Southwest Michigan Devil Rays.

In January 2006, the Devil Rays were sold to the non-profit Michigan Baseball Foundation and relocated to Midland, Michigan, in 2007. The team was renamed the Great Lakes Loons. A lack of interest from the Battle Creek community was the main reason for the move. Reduced ticket prices (even a night when fans were actually offered a dollar to come to that night's game) failed to pique the interest of local residents.

Naming rights for the Loons' stadium were purchased by Dow Chemical, which is headquartered in Midland. The company named the stadium "Dow Diamond." Ground was broken on the stadium on April 11, 2006, with construction taking 367 days to complete. In September 2006, the team announced its new affiliation with the Los Angeles Dodgers. In November 2006, the Loons named Lance Parrish as the team's first manager since the move to Michigan's Tri-City Area. The first home game was played on April 13, 2007.

After nine seasons in Midland, the Loons went through an overhaul of their logos and brand to give the franchise a fresh, updated look heading into its 10th season in 2016.

On September 18, 2016, the Loons clinched their first Midwest League championship following a 9–8 victory over the Seattle Mariners-affiliated  Clinton LumberKings. The Loons won the championship series 3–1, following three-game series victories over the Bowling Green Hot Rods (Tampa Bay Rays) and West Michigan Whitecaps (Detroit Tigers) in the previous rounds. The Loons were managed by Gil Velazquez.

The Loons have hosted the Midwest League All-Star Game on two occasions (2008 and 2017).

On August 23, 2019, the Loons hosted their largest crowd ever of 6,671 people.

In conjunction with Major League Baseball's restructuring of Minor League Baseball in 2021, the Loons were organized into the High-A Central. In 2022, the High-A Central became known as the Midwest League, the name historically used by the regional circuit prior to the 2021 reorganization.

Season-by-season records

Mascot
Lou E. Loon is the team mascot and Ambassador of Fun for the team. He's an energetic bird who loves to dance at home games and make public appearances. The kids' play area at the diamond is named Lou E.'s Lookout in his honor. He often leads fans in his signature cheer, the "Funky Feather", which won "Best In-Game Promotion of the Year" in 2009 for Minor League Baseball.

"Rall E. Camel" was introduced as the team's second mascot in April 2012. He is an honorary deputy ambassador of mischief and is an ostensibly goofy addition to the staff of the Great Lakes Loons.

Roster

Notable Great Lakes Loons alumni

 Scott Barlow
 Rafael Betancourt (1996)
 John Buck (1999–2000) MLB All-Star
 Walker Buehler (2016) Combined no-hitter
 Melky Cabrera (2004) MLB All-Star
 Tyler Clippard (2004) 2-time MLB All-Star
 Wade Davis (2006) 3-time MLB All-Star
 Justin Duchscherer (1997) 2-time MLB All-Star
 Dee Gordon (2009) 2-time MLB All-Star; 2015 NL batting title
 Shea Hillenbrand (1997–1998) 2-time MLB All-Star
 Kenley Jansen (2007–2008) 2-time MLB All-Star
 John Jaso (2005)
 Clayton Kershaw (2007) 8-time MLB All-Star; 5-time NL ERA title (2011–2014, 2016); 3-time NL Cy Young Award (2011, 2013–2014) 2020 World Series Champion
 Jason Lane (2000)
 Aaron Miles (1997)
 Roy Oswalt (1999) 3-time MLB All-Star; 2006 NL ERA title
 Lance Parrish (2007, MGR) 8-time MLB All-Star
 Carl Pavano (1997) MLB All-Star
 Joc Pederson (2011) 2-time MLB All-Star
 Chad Qualls (2001)
 Tim Redding (1999)
Bubby Rossman (2015)
 Carlos Santana (2007) All-Star
 Johan Santana 4-time MLB All-Star; 3-time AL ERA title (2004, 2006, 2008); 2-time AL Cy Young Award (2004, 2006)
 Corey Seager (2014) 2-time MLB All-Star; 2016 NL Rookie of the Year

See also
 WLUN (sports radio station owned by the Loons)

Sources

References

External links

 Official website

Baseball teams established in 1982
Midwest League teams
Midland, Michigan
Professional baseball teams in Michigan
Los Angeles Dodgers minor league affiliates
Tampa Bay Devil Rays minor league affiliates
New York Yankees minor league affiliates
Houston Astros minor league affiliates
Boston Red Sox minor league affiliates
St. Louis Cardinals minor league affiliates
1982 establishments in Michigan
High-A Central teams